Robert Wodefold (fl. 1446–1447) was an English politician.

He was a Member (MP) of the Parliament of England for Lewes in the 1447 Parliament.

References

Year of birth missing
Year of death missing
English MPs 1447